Indiana elected its members August 2, 1824.

See also 
 1824 Indiana's 1st congressional district special election
 1824 and 1825 United States House of Representatives elections
 List of United States representatives from Indiana

1824
Indiana
United States House of Representatives